Tore Sune Torvald Johansson (19 October 1920 – 5 April 2002) was a Swedish rower. He competed at the 1952 Summer Olympics in Helsinki with the men's double sculls where they were eliminated in the round one repêchage.

References

1920 births
2002 deaths
Swedish male rowers
Olympic rowers of Sweden
Rowers at the 1952 Summer Olympics
People from Vaxholm Municipality
European Rowing Championships medalists
Sportspeople from Stockholm County
20th-century Swedish people